Four ships of the Royal Navy have borne the name HMS Thrasher:

  was a 12-gun brig, previously the mercantile Adamant, built in 1804, and purchased that year by the navy. She was sold in 1814 and wrecked in 1815.
She was built in 1856 and sold in 1883.
  was a  torpedo boat destroyer, completed in 1895. She served in the First World War, and was sold in 1919.
  was a T-class submarine.  She  was launched in 1940 and served in the Second World War. She was broken up in 1947.

See also
 

Royal Navy ship names